Baegunsan is a mountain in Gangwon-do, South Korea. Its area extends across the counties of Jeongseon and Pyeongchang.

See also
List of mountains in Korea

Notes

References

Jeongseon County
Pyeongchang County
Mountains of Gangwon Province, South Korea
Mountains of South Korea